Fred Haughey (12 May 1921 – 30 October 2011) was an English professional footballer who played as a left back.

Career
Born in Conisbrough, Haughey played for Halifax Town and Bradford City.

For Bradford City he made 3 appearances in the Football League.

Sources

References

1921 births
2011 deaths
English footballers
Halifax Town A.F.C. players
Bradford City A.F.C. players
English Football League players
Association football fullbacks